Deltophora korbi is a moth of the family Gelechiidae. It is found in the Russian Far East and China.

The length of the forewings is about 5.5 mm. The forewings are greyish brown with dark markings.

References

Moths described in 1920
Deltophora